Events from the year 1987 in the United States.

Incumbents

Federal government 
 President: Ronald Reagan (R-California)
 Vice President: George H. W. Bush (R-Texas)
 Chief Justice: William Rehnquist (Wisconsin)
 Speaker of the House of Representatives: Tip O'Neill (D-Massachusetts) (until January 3), Jim Wright (D-Texas) (starting January 6)
 Senate Majority Leader: Bob Dole (R-Kansas) (until January 3), Robert Byrd (D-West Virginia) (starting January 3)
 Congress: 99th (until January 3), 100th (starting January 3)

Events

January
 January 5 – President Ronald Reagan undergoes prostate surgery, causing speculation about his physical fitness to continue in office.
 January 13 – New York mafiosi Anthony "Fat Tony" Salerno and Carmine Peruccia are sentenced to 100 years in prison for racketeering.
 January 22 – Pennsylvania State Treasurer R. Budd Dwyer commits suicide by shooting himself during a press conference. The incident was captured by news cameras and later broadcast on television.
 January 27 – State of the Union Address.
 January 28 – The U.S. State Department invalidates US passports for travel to or through Lebanon due to security concerns. The ban was lifted in 1997.
 January 29 – William J. Casey ends his term as Director of the Central Intelligence Agency.
 January 31 – The last Ohrbach's department store closes in New York City after 64 years of operation.

February
 February 9 – Brownsville, Texas, receives  of rain in just two hours; flooding in some parts of the city is worse than that caused by Hurricane Beulah in 1967.
 February 11 – The United States military detonates an atomic weapon at the Nevada Test Site.
 February 20 – A second Unabomber bomb explodes at a computer store in Salt Lake City, injuring the owner.
 February 26 – Iran-Contra affair: The Tower Commission rebukes U.S. President Ronald Reagan for not controlling his National Security Council staff.

March
 March 2 – American Motors Corporation is acquired by the Chrysler Corporation.
 March 4 
U.S. President Ronald Reagan addresses the American people on the Iran-Contra Affair, acknowledging that his overtures to Iran had 'deteriorated' into an arms-for-hostages deal.
Jonathan Pollard is sentenced to life in prison on one count of espionage.
 March 18 – Woodstock of physics: The marathon session of the American Physical Society’s meeting features 51 presentations concerning the science of high-temperature superconductors.
 March 19 – In Charlotte, North Carolina, televangelist Jim Bakker, head of PTL Ministries, resigns after admitting an affair with church secretary Jessica Hahn.
 March 29 – World Wrestling Entertainment presents WrestleMania III in Pontiac, Michigan. Hulk Hogan retains the WWF World Heavyweight Championship defeating his former friend André The Giant.
 March 30 – The 59th Academy Awards, hosted by Chevy Chase, Goldie Hawn and Paul Hogan, are held at Dorothy Chandler Pavilion in Los Angeles. Oliver Stone's Platoon wins four awards out of eight nominations, including Best Picture and Best Director. The film is tied in nominations by James Ivory's A Room with a View.

April
 April 5 – The Fox Network makes its primetime debut.
 April 23 – L'Ambiance Plaza collapse: 28 construction workers are killed at a residential project under construction in Bridgeport, Connecticut. It was one of the worst disasters in Connecticut history.
 April 27 – The United States Department of Justice declares incumbent Austrian president Kurt Waldheim an "undesirable alien".

May
 May 8 – U.S. Senator Gary Hart drops out of the running for the 1988 Democratic presidential nomination, amid allegations of an extramarital affair with Donna Rice.
 May 17 – The USS Stark is hit by two Iraqi owned Exocet AM39 air-to-surface missiles, killing 37 sailors.
 May 21 – Andrew Wyeth, with his "Helga Pictures," becomes the first living American painter to have a one-man show of his work in the West Building of the National Gallery of Art in Washington, DC.
 May 24 
 Approximately 800,000 people gather for a walk to celebrate the 50th anniversary of the opening of the Golden Gate Bridge in San Francisco, California. 
 Five days before his 48th birthday, Al Unser became the oldest winner of the Indianapolis 500 and only the second driver to win the event four times.

June
 June 12 – During a visit to Berlin, Germany, U.S. President Ronald Reagan challenges Soviet General Secretary Mikhail Gorbachev to tear down the Berlin Wall.
June 16 – Bernhard Goetz is exonerated on 12 of 13 counts by a jury in the case against him stemming from the 1984 shootings of four youths in a New York subway car.
 June 19 
Teddy Seymour is officially designated the first black man to sail around the world, when he completes his solo sailing circumnavigation in Frederiksted, St. Croix, of the United States Virgin Islands.
Edwards v. Aguillard: The Supreme Court of the United States rules that a Louisiana law requiring that creation science be taught in public schools whenever evolution is taught is unconstitutional.
 June 28 – An accidental explosion at Hohenfels Training Area in West Germany kills 3 U.S. troopers.

July

 July 1 – U.S. President Ronald Reagan nominates former Solicitor General Robert Bork to the Supreme Court. The nomination is later rejected by the Senate, the first and only nominee rejection to date.
 July 17 – The Dow Jones Industrial Average closes above the 2,500 mark for the first time, at 2,510.04.
 July 25 – United States Secretary of Commerce Malcolm Baldrige Jr. dies in a rodeo accident at a California ranch.

August
 August 7–23 – Pan American Games are held in Indianapolis.
 August 16 – Northwest Airlines Flight 255 (a McDonnell Douglas MD-82) crashes on takeoff from Detroit Metropolitan Airport in Romulus, Michigan just West of Detroit killing all but one (4-year old Cecelia Cichan) of the 156 people on board (among them Nick Vanos, a center for the Phoenix Suns).
 August 19 – ABC News chief Middle East correspondent Charles Glass escapes his Hezbollah kidnappers in Beirut, Lebanon, after 62 days in captivity.

September
 September 17 – Televangelist Pat Robertson announces his candidacy for the 1988 Republican presidential nomination.
 September 25 – Varroa destructor, an invasive parasite, is found for the first time in the U.S.

October
 October – The unemployment rate drops below 6% for the first time since 1979.
 October 1 – The 5.9  Whittier Narrows earthquake affected the Los Angeles Area with a maximum Mercalli intensity of VIII (Severe), killing eight and injuring 200.
 October 10 – Reverend Jesse Jackson launches his second campaign for U.S. president.
 October 11 – The first National Coming Out Day is held in celebration of the second National March on Washington for Lesbian and Gay Rights.
 October 14–16 – A young child, Jessica McClure, falls down a well in Midland, Texas, and is later rescued.
 October 19 
Black Monday: Stock market levels fall sharply on Wall Street and around the world.
U.S. warships destroy two Iranian oil platforms in the Persian Gulf
 October 23 – On a vote of 58–42, the United States Senate rejects President Ronald Reagan's nomination of Robert Bork to the Supreme Court.
 October 25 – 1987 World Series: The Minnesota Twins defeat the St. Louis Cardinals despite having the worst regular season win–loss ratio for a winner, a record they hold until 2006.
 October 26 – The Dow Jones Industrial Average goes down 156.83 points; at the time it is the second largest decrease ever (trailing Black Monday).

November
 November 6 – Florida rapist Tommy Lee Andrews is the first person to be convicted as a result of DNA fingerprinting: he is sentenced to 22 years in prison.
 November 18 – Iran-Contra affair: U.S. Senate and House panels release reports charging President Ronald Reagan with 'ultimate responsibility' for the affair.
 November 22 – The Max Headroom Incident: An unidentified person hijacks two television stations in Chicago, Illinois, and broadcasts video of them wearing a mask in the likeness of the character Max Headroom.
 November 23 – Frank Carlucci is sworn in as the new Secretary of Defense, succeeding Caspar Weinberger.

December
 December – The unemployment rate drops to 5.7%, the lowest since July 1979.
 December 1 – NASA announces the names of four companies who were awarded contracts to help build Space Station Freedom: Boeing Aerospace, General Electric's Astro-Space Division, McDonnell Douglas, and the Rocketdyne Division of Rockwell.
 December 2 – Hustler Magazine v. Falwell is argued before the U.S. Supreme Court.
 December 7 – Pacific Southwest Airlines Flight 1771 crashes near Paso Robles, California, killing all 43 on board, after a disgruntled passenger shoots his ex-supervisor on the flight, then shoots both pilots and himself.
 December 8 – The Intermediate-Range Nuclear Forces Treaty is signed in Washington, D.C. by U.S. President Ronald Reagan and Soviet leader Mikhail Gorbachev.
 December 10 – A squirrel closes down the Nasdaq Stock Exchange when it burrows through a telephone line.
 December 22-December 28 – Ronald Gene Simmons goes on a 6-day killing spree in Russellville, Arkansas, killing his wife, children, and grandchildren as they arrived to celebrate the holidays at his home. On the 28th he went on a shooting spree, killing an additional woman and wounding 5 others before surrendering to police. The final death toll was 16. He was tried and eventually executed.
 December 29 – Prozac makes its debut in the United States.
unknown date – Varroa destructor, an invasive parasite of honeybees, is found in the United States.

Ongoing
 Cold War (1947–1991)
 Iran–Contra affair (1985–1987)

Undated
Team San Francisco, an athletics squad is formed in San Francisco.
Vegas Chips, a snack food manufacturer in North Las Vegas, Nevada is founded.
Vinzant Software is founded in Indiana.

Births

January

 January 1
 Will Brandenburg, Olympic alpine skier
 Gia Coppola, film director, screenwriter, and actress
 Meryl Davis, Olympic figure skater
 Ryan Perrilloux, football player
 January 2
 Shelley Hennig, actress and model
 Syesha Mercado, singer
 Lauren Storm, actress and acting coach
 January 5 
 Dexter Bean, stock car racing driver
 Kristin Cavallari, actress
 Jason Mitchell, actor
 January 6 
 Arin Hanson, internet personality, comedian, voice actor, songwriter, rapper, animator and cartoonist
 Ndamukong Suh, football player
 January 7
 Brandon Bantz, baseball player
 Michael Callahan, soccer player
 Melanie Cruise, wrestler
 Alisha Edwards, wrestler
 Lyndsy Fonseca, actress
 January 10 – Perrish Cox, football player
 January 11 – Scotty Cranmer, BMX rider
 January 12
 Deena Nicole Cortese, television personality
 Naya Rivera, actress and singer (d. 2020)
 Will Rothhaar, actor
 January 13
 Parker Croft, actor and screenwriter
 Max Van Ville, DJ, producer, and actor
 January 14 – James Belfer, producer, founder and CEO of Cartuna, founder and CEO of Dogfish Pictures, and founder and managing director of Dogfish Accelerator
 January 15
 Daniel Caluag, BMX racer
 Kelly Kelly, model and wrestler
 January 16 – Callahan Bright, football player
 January 17
 Jeff Beliveau, baseball player
 John Cochran, television writer and personality
 Tony Crocker, basketball player
 January 18
 Jackie Acevedo, American-born Mexican footballer
 Nolan Carroll, football player
 January 19 – Jordan Brauninger, figure skater
 January 20
 Diana Barrera, American-born Guatemalan footballer
 Peter Broderick, musician and composer
 Evan Peters, actor
 Pete Ploszek, actor
 January 21 – Brandon Crawford, baseball player
 January 22
 Timroy Allen, Jamaican-born cricketer
 Ray Rice, football player
 January 23
 Whitney Boddie, basketball player
 Jarrett Brown, football player
 January 24
 Marlon Amprey, politician
 Travis Beckum, football player
 Brian Cushing, football player
 January 25 – Isaako Aaitui, football player
 January 26
 Patrick Cullity, ice hockey player
 Andrew J. Ferchland, actor
 January 27
 Rucka Rucka Ali, rapper, singer, comedian, and YouTuber
 Ashley Avis, screenwriter, director, and producer
 Marcus Brown, football player
 Anthony Pettis, mixed martial artist
 Katy Rose, singer/songwriter
 Hannah Teter, Olympic snowboarder
 January 28
 Alexandria Anderson, track and field sprinter
 David Bowen, politician
 Chelsea Brummet, actress and singer
 Katie Nolan, sports personality and TV host
 January 29 
 Alex Avila, baseball player
 Jessica Burkhart, author
 Spencer Clark, stock car racing driver (d. 2006)
 Alex Murrel, singer and actress
 January 30 – Phil Lester, YouTube personality
 January 31
 Pat Angerer, football player
 Kurt Baker, musician, songwriter, music producer, and multi-instrumentalist
 Brandon Bollig, ice hockey player
 Tyler Hubbard, country singer and one half of Florida Georgia Line
 Marcus Mumford, English-born singer/songwriter, musician, and frontman for Mumford & Sons

February

 February 1
 Heather Morris, actress and dancer
 Ronda Rousey, actress and mixed martial artist
 February 2
 McKay Coppins, journalist and author
 Martin Spanjers, actor
 February 4 – Cameron Achord, football coach
 February 5
 Adassa, reggaeton singer
 Brandon Bender, mixed martial artist
 Kyle Bochniak, mixed martial artist
 Alex Brightman, actor, singer, and writer
 Chris Brooks, football player
 David Buehler, football player
 Darren Criss, actor
 Raymond Lee, actor
 Donald Sanford, American-born Israeli Olympic sprinter
 February 6
 Pedro Álvarez, baseball player
 J. J. Ambrose, mixed martial artist
 Robb Brent, stock car racing driver
 February 7 – Cynthia Barboza, volleyball player
 February 8 – Jessica Jerome, Olympic ski jumper
 February 9
 Henry Cejudo, mixed martial artist
 Michael B. Jordan, actor and producer
 February 10
 Devon Alexander, boxer
 Anastasia Ashley, surfer and model
 Justin Braun, ice hockey player
 February 11
 Mara Allen, rower
 Matt Besler, soccer player
 February 12
 David Cooper, baseball player
 Gary LeRoi Gray, actor 
 February 13
 Ryan Buchter, baseball player
 Steven Dehler, model, actor, and dancer
 Aileen Geving, Olympic curler
 Rau'shee Warren, boxer
 February 14
 Marquez Branson, football player
 Don Carey, football player
 Joe Pichler, actor missing From 2006
 Candace Wiggins, basketball player
 February 15 – Chris Cook, football player
 February 16
 Leslie Cole, sprinter
 Jon Ossoff, politician
 February 17
 Brady Beeson, football player
 Da'Mon Cromartie-Smith, football player
 Jon Curran, golfer
 Danny Farquhar, baseball player
 Tiquan Underwood, football player
 February 18
 Elijah Allan-Blitz, actor, musician, and director
 Samantha Bosco, Paralympic cyclist
 February 20
 Taylor Boggs, football player
 Miles Teller, actor
 Daniella Pineda, actress 
 February 21
 Leilani Akiyama, judoka
 Ashley Greene, actress and model
 February 23
 Ab-Soul, rapper
 Nyan Boateng, football player
 February 24 – Ulysses Cuadra, actor and voice actor
 February 25 – Natalie Dreyfuss, actress
 February 26
 Landon Brown, politician
 Mike Caussin, football player
 February 27
 Alexandra Bracken, author
 Gregory Brigman, Paralympic football player and soccer referee
 February 28
 Anabelle Acosta, Cuban-born actress
 Kaitlin Cochran, softball player
 Michelle Horn, actress
 Josh McRoberts, basketball player
 Stephanie Sigman, Mexican-born actress

March

 March 1 
 Navarone Garibaldi, singer
 Kesha, singer
 March 2
 Chris Clements, soccer player
 Brandon Corp, lacrosse player
 March 4 – Dan Cortes, baseball player
 March 7 – Justin Bamberg, politician
 March 8
 Devon Graye, actor
 Milana Vayntrub, Uzbek-born actress and comedian
 March 9 – Bow Wow, rapper
 March 10 
 Ser'Darius Blain, actor
 Martellus Bennett, football player
 Taylor Coutu, golfer
 Corey Paul, Christian hip-hop artist
 March 11
 Levi Brown, football player
 Kristina Carrillo-Bucaram, writer, speaker, and raw vegan activist
 March 12 – Jessica Hardy, Olympic swimmer
 March 13 – Marco Andretti, race car driver
 March 14
 Marisa Abegg, soccer player
 Craig Austrie, basketball player
 Andrew Bumbalough, middle and long distance runner
 Danny Chavez, mixed martial artist
 Robert Clark, American-born Canadian actor
 March 15 – Steve Cilladi, baseball player
 March 17
 Bryan Dechart, actor and Twitch streamer
 Josh Gilbert, bassist, vocalist, songwriter and producer for As I Lay Dying and Wovenwar
 Rob Kardashian, TV personality, model, and talent manager
 March 18
 Sherron Collins, basketball player
 Rebecca Soni, Olympic swimmer
 March 19
 Thana Alexa, jazz vocalist, composer, arranger, and producer
 AJ Lee, wrestler
 Josie Loren, actress
 March 20
 DrLupo, youtuber and Twitch streamer
 Jon Brockman, basketball player
 Zack Lively, actor
 March 21
 Michael Brady, baseball player
 Carlos Carrasco, Venezuelan-born baseball player
 March 22
 Thomas Beadle, politician
 Ike Davis, baseball player
 Billy Kametz, actor (died 2022)
 March 23 – Earl Bennett, football player
 March 24
 Nate Carroll, football coach
 Josh Zeid, baseball player
 March 25
 Diego Barrera, Colombian-born soccer player
 Stephen Belichick, football coach
 Jason Castro, acoustic/folk-pop singer/songwriter and real estate agent
 Kim Cloutier, Canadian-born model
 March 27
 Peter and Will Anderson, twin jazz musicians
 Buster Posey, baseball player
 Kyle J. White, U.S. Army Veteran in the Afghan War and Medal of Honor Recipient
 March 28 
 Kagney Linn Karter, pornographic actress
 Mary Kate Wiles, actress
 Jimmy Wong, actor and musician
 Jonathan Van Ness, hairdresser and media personality
 March 30
 Reggie Arnold, football player
 Morgan Beck, volleyball player
 Trent Beretta, wrestler
 Andrew Berry, general manager & executive vice president of football operations
 Mike Broadway, baseball player
 March 31
 Peter Bourjos, baseball player
 Justin Braun, soccer player

April

 April 3
 Rachel Bloom, actress
 Deryn Bowser, football player
 Jay Bruce, baseball player
 SethBling, video game commentator and Twitch video game live streamer
 April 6
 Jerrod Carmichael, comedian, actor, and filmmaker
 Hilary Rhoda, model
 April 7
 Danny Almonte, Dominican-born baseball player
 Jared Cook, football player
 Jack Johnson, actor
 April 8 – Jake Anderson, basketball player
 April 9
 Marc E. Bassy, singer/songwriter
 Eric Campbell, baseball player
 Craig Mabbitt, singer/songwriter, recording artist, and frontman for Escape the Fate
 Jesse McCartney, actor and singer
 Jazmine Sullivan, singer/songwriter
 April 10
 J.R. Artozqui, football player
 Charles Brown, football player
 Jamie Renée Smith, actress
 April 11
 Brittany Bock, soccer player
 Donald Brown, football player
 Michelle Phan, make-up demonstrator
 April 12
 Jamelle Bouie, columnist for The New York Times
 Brooklyn Decker, fashion model and actress
 Ilana Glazer, comedian, writer and actress
 Mike Manning, actor
 Brendon Urie, singer, frontman for Panic! At The Disco, and stage actor
 April 13
 Genevieve Angelson, actress
 Jeremy Barnes, baseball player
 April 14 – Michael Baze, jockey (d. 2011)
 April 15 – Samira Wiley, actress and model
 April 16 
 Justin Bibb, politician, mayor of Cleveland, Ohio
 Richard Bleier, baseball player
 Maricela Cornejo, boxer
 Neil Haskell, actor and dancer
 April 18
 Matt Anderson, volleyball player
 Dustin Bell, football player
 Jamelle Cornley, basketball player
 Ellen Woglom, actress
 April 19 – Courtland Mead, actor
 April 20
 John Patrick Amedori, actor and musician
 Dusty Coleman, baseball player
 April 21
 Ryan Adams, baseball player
 Eryk Anders, mixed martial artist
 Justin Carter, basketball player
 Abel Cullum, mixed martial artist
 April 22
 Kacey Bellamy, ice hockey player
 Blackie, musician and record producer
 Dante Cunningham, basketball player
 Brandon Tatum, political commentator
 April 23
 Summit1g, twitch streamer and esports athlete
 T-Bar, wrestler
 April 24
 Brooke Barbuto, soccer player
 Anjelica Castillo, murder victim (d. 1991)
 April 26
 Justin Bibb, politician
 Bobby Butler, ice hockey player
 Jessica Lee Rose, actress
 April 27
 Charlie Berens, journalist, comedian, and creator of "Manitowoc Minute"
 Jamal Boykin, basketball player
 Taylor Chorney, Canadian-born ice hockey player
 April 28
 Ryan Adeleye, American-born Israeli soccer player
 Patrick Branco, politician
 Daequan Cook, basketball player
 April 29
 Jeff Ayres, basketball player
 Alejandro Bedoya, soccer player
 Alicia Morton, actress and singer
 April 30 – Al Iaquinta, mixed martial artist

May

 May 1
 Evan Brown, soccer player
 Glen Coffee, football player
 May 2
 Jeff Cumberland, football player
 Pat McAfee, football player
 May 4
 Alex Boone, football player
 Bryan Braman, football player
 May 5
 Eliot Bostar, politician
 Cortney Casey, mixed martial artist
 Ian Michael Smith, actor
 May 6
 Teddy Abrams, conductor, pianist, clarinetist, and composer
 Lani Forbes, author (d. 2022)
 Peter Kaiser, dog musher
 Meek Mill, rapper
 May 7 
 Aidy Bryant, actress and comedian
 Maya Erskine, actress
 May 10
 Eileen April Boylan, actress
 Wilson Chandler, basketball player
 May 11 
 Lince Dorado, pro wrestler
 Justin King, football player
 Louis Murphy, football player
 May 12
 Tyson Alualu, football player
 Josh Bostic, basketball player
 Weldon Brown, football player
 Rafael Bush, football player
 Clams Casino, record producer and songwriter
 Robbie Rogers, TV producer and soccer player  
 May 13
 Matt Doyle, actor
 Misha Gabriel, dancer
 Candice King, actress and singer/songwriter
 Hunter Parrish, actor and singer
 May 15
 David Adams, baseball player
 Darry Beckwith, football player
 Bruce G. Blowers, Christian singer/songwriter
 Michael Brantley, baseball player
 Brian Dozier, baseball player
 May 16
 Spencer Adkins, football player
 Mark Aguhar, LGBT rights activist, writer, and multimedia fine artist (d. 2012)
 Tyler Cloyd, baseball player
 Sharaud Curry, basketball player
 May 17 – Cash Wheeler, wrestler
 May 18
 Chris Baumann, rugby player
 Mondaire Jones, politician
 May 19
 Michael Angelakos, musician, singer/songwriter, and record producer
 David Caldwell, football player
 Kristi Cirone, basketball player and coach
 Danny Curzon, pair figure skater
 Stacey Park Milbern, South Korean-born disability rights activist (d. 2022)
 May 20
 Ray Chase, voice actor
 Eric Crocker, football player
 Julian Wright, basketball player
 May 21
 Matt Bischoff, baseball player
 Brent Bowden, football player
 Cody Johnson, country singer/songwriter
 May 22
 Jack Carlson, author, designer, and rowing coxswain
 Jaye Chapman, baseball player
 May 23
 Josh Breslow, realtor
 Bray Wyatt, wrestler
 May 24 – Marline Barberena, American-born Nicaraguan beauty pageant titleholder, Miss Nicaragua 2014
 May 25 – Kirk Carlsen, cyclist
 May 26
 Tim Bowman Jr., gospel musician
 Crezdon Butler, football player
 Brandi Cyrus, actress, singer and DJ
 May 27
 Bas, rapper
 Michael Bramos, basketball player
 May 28 – Jessica Rothe, actress
 May 29
 Avery Atkins, football player (d. 2007)
 Joey Haro, actor 
 Alessandra Torresani, actress
 Noah Reid, Canadian-born actor and musician
 May 30
 Javicia Leslie, actress
 Brianna Taylor, television personality and singer/songwriter
 May 31
 Shaun Fleming, actor and musician
 Meredith Hagner, actress

June

 June 1
 Bonner Bolton, model and bull rider
 Jerel McNeal, Professional Basketball Player
 June 2
 Jonathan Borrajo, soccer player
 Bronson Burgoon, golfer
 Lee J. Carter, politician
 Paul Carter, basketball player
 Matthew Koma, singer/songwriter, DJ and record producer  
 Caitlin Mallory, American-born Estonian ice dancer
 June 3
 Jonathan Casillas, football player
 Lalaine, actress, singer/songwriter, and bassist
 June 4
 Miles Batty, middle-distance runner
 Tori Praver, model and swimwear designer
 June 7 – Cassius Chaney, boxer
 June 8
 Terry M. Brown Jr., politician
 John Conner, football player
 June 9
 JB Baretsky, singer/songwriter
 Austin Bisnow, musician, songwriter, record producer, and frontman for Magic Giant
 Rheagan Wallace, actress
 June 10
 Lyssa Chapman, businesswoman, television personality, bail bondswoman, and bounty hunter
 Jeremy Chappell, basketball player
 June 11 – Nichole Cheza, dirt track motorcycle racer
 June 12
 Seyi Ajirotutu, football player
 Jeff Allen, basketball player
 June 13
 E. J. Biggers, football player
 John Bryant, basketball player
 Arielle Charnas, fashion blogger and influencer
 Franchón Crews-Dezurn, boxer
 Leone Cruz, soccer player
 June 14
 Anthony Clark, cyclo-cross cyclist
 Chris Carter, football player
 Ross A. McGinnis, U.S. Army Veteran in the Iraq War and Medal of Honor Recipient (d. 2006)
 Cameron Russell, model
 June 15 – Van Ferro, actor  
 June 16
 Kelly Blatz, actor and singer
 Wayne Chism, American-born Bahraini basketball player
 Diana DeGarmo, singer and Broadway actress
 Abby Elliott, actress and comedian
 June 17 – Kendrick Lamar, rapper
 June 18
 Jeremy Bleich, American-born Israeli baseball player
 Jason Castro, baseball player
 Brandon Cutler, wrestler
 Melanie Iglesias, model and actress
 June 19
 Fabiola Arias, Cuban-born fashion designer
 Mikail Baker, football player
 Alex Carrington, football player
 Keenan Clayton, football player
 Rashard Mendenhall, football player
 June 21
 Oliver Baez Bendorf, poet and writer
 Kyle Calloway, football player (d. 2016)
 June 22
 Nathan Bauman, entertainment consultant and drummer
 Jerrod Carmichael, stand-Up comedian, actor and writer
 Delone Carter, football player
 June 23
 Quinton Andrews, football player
 Haley Strode, actress
 June 24
 Ronnie Aguilar, basketball player
 Duane Brooks, football player
 June 25
 Maurice Acker, basketball player
 J'Nathan Bullock, basketball player
 Brian Canter, bull rider
 Alissa Czisny, figure skater
 Mark Titus, author and pod-caster
 Scott Terra, actor
 June 26
 Alric Arnett, football player
 Zoraida Córdova, Ecuadorian-born author
 Russell Currier, Olympic biathlete
 June 28 – Brandon Brooks, basketball player
 June 29
 Les Brown, football player
 Lewis Clinch, basketball player
 June 30 – Ryan Cook, baseball player

July

 July 1
 Kevin Alexander, football player
 Zeda Zhang, wrestler and mixed martial artist
 July 2
 Dan Black, baseball player
 Brett Cooper, mixed martial artist
 July 3
 Will Barker, football player
 Chad Broskey, actor
 Casey Coleman, baseball player
 Chris Hunter, actor
 July 5 – Erik Cook, football player
 July 6
 Sophie Auster, singer/songwriter
 Matt O'Leary, actor  
 July 7
 Alysha Clark, American-born Israeli basketball player
 Colin Cochart, football player
 Steven Crowder, American-born Canadian conservative political commentator, comedian, and YouTuber
 Julianna Guill, actress 
 Richie Steamboat, wrestler
 July 9
 Anna, Japanese-born singer
 Ashlee Evans-Smith, mixed martial artist
 Rebecca Sugar, animator and creator of Steven Universe
 July 10
 Brian Jordan Alvarez, actor and filmmaker
 Isaac Baron, poker player
 Jermaine Curtis, baseball player
 July 11
 Phil Costa, football player
 A. J. Locascio, actor, voice actor, film director and producer
 Cristina Vee, voice actress
 July 12
 Dobson Collins, football player
 Graig Cooper, football player
 Tilian Pearson, singer/songwriter, and musician
 July 13 – Cynthia Calvillo, mixed martial artist
 July 14
 Charly Arnolt, sports broadcaster and television personality
 Sarah Burgess, singer/songwriter and American Idol contestant
 Drew Fortier, musician, songwriter, filmmaker and actor
 Dan Reynolds, singer and musician
 July 15
 Nikki Bohne, singer, actress, and dancer
 Kevin Croom, mixed martial artist
 Alex Lasry, businessman and co-owner of the Milwaukee Bucks
 July 16
 Will Acton, American-born Canadian ice hockey player
 Kate Berlant, comedian, actress, and writer
 Kira Buckland, voice actress
 Catherine Charlebois, actress
 AnnaLynne McCord, actress and model
 July 17
 Stevie Brown, football player
 Jorrick Calvin, football player
 Meghan Camarena, YouTuber and internet personality
 McKenzie Cantrell, politician
 Eric Carpenter, soccer player
 Jaime Chavez, soccer player
 Nick Christiani, baseball player
 July 19
 Yoel Bouza, technology entrepreneur and investor
 Jon Jones, mixed martial artist
 July 21
 Jen Corey, beauty pageant titleholder, event planner, and community activist
 Carla Cortijo, basketball player
 Brandon Costner, basketball player
 Kami Craig, Olympic water polo player
 Peter Doocy, journalist
 July 22 – Bre-Z, actress and rapper
 July 23
 David Bruton, football player
 Chris Connolly, ice hockey player
 July 24
 Matt Asiata, football player
 Jovan Belcher, football player (d. 2012)
 Tiffany Cabán, politician
 Mattie Montgomery, singer/songwriter and frontman of For Today
 Mara Wilson, actress and writer
 July 25
 Richard Bachman, ice hockey player
 Heather Bratton, fashion model (d. 2006)
 Jonathan Crompton, football player
 Michael Welch, actor 
 Jule 26
 03 Greedo, rapper, singer/songwriter, and producer
 Elise Addis, soccer player
 Alex Burnett, baseball player
 July 28
 Abbey Curran, beauty pageant contestant
 Asher Grodman, actor
 John Stevens, singer
 July 29
 Victor Butler, football player
 Sabra Johnson, dancer
 Genesis Rodriguez, actress and model
 July 30 – Brandon Caleb, football player
 July 31
 Colin Baxter, football player
 Michael Bradley, soccer player

August

 August 2
 Ashley Cummins, mixed martial artist
 Nayer, pop singer
 August 4
 Jackie Aina, beauty vlogger
 Antonio Bass, football player
 Nadia Bulkin, Indonesian-born political scientist
 Caressa Cameron, beauty pageant titleholder and singer
 August 5
 R. J. Archer, football player
 Tim Federowicz, baseball player
 August 7 – Everette Brown, football player and coach
 August 9 – Jabari Brisport, politician
 August 10
 Charles Clark, sprinter
 TJ Curry, taekwondo practitioner
 August 13
 Andre Bellos, actor, singer, and dancer
 Lady Cam, rapper
 Lena Chen, feminist artist, writer, and activist
 Katy Crawford, Christian musician
 Chris Plys, Olympic curler
 August 14
 Sammy Adams, rapper and singer/songwriter
 Montrell Craft, football player
 Johnny Gargano, wrestler  
 Curt Hansen, actor
 Colton Smith, mixed martial artist  
 Tim Tebow, football and baseball player  
 August 15 – Ryan D'Imperio, football player
 August 16
 Suzi Analogue, recording artist, musician, and songwriter
 Dominique Curry, football player
 August 17 – Dominick Casola, stock car racing driver
 August 18
 Mika Boorem, actress
 Elizabeth Chambers, television personality
 August 19
 Dominique Archie, basketball player
 Jeremy Campbell, Paralympic pentathlete
 Patrick Chung, football player
 August 21
 DeWanna Bonner, American-born Macedonian basketball player
 Annie Chandler, swimmer
 Cody Kasch, actor
 August 22
 Jim Cordle, football player
 Apollo Crews, wrestler
 August 23
 Zach Braddock, baseball player
 Darren Collison, basketball player
 August 24 – Jon Scheyer, basketball player
 August 25
 Jim Cook Jr., writer, actor, and filmmaker
 Katie Hill, politician
 Blake Lively, actress
 Liu Yifei, Chinese-born actress
 Justin Upton, baseball player
 August 26 – Ryan Brasier, baseball player
 August 27
 Brett Bochy, baseball player
 Tiffany Boone, actress
 August 28 – David Carr, politician
 August 29
 Conor Chinn, soccer player
 Max Cream, soccer player
 August 30
 Johanna Braddy, actress
 Cody Connelly, motorcycle designer and builder
 August 31
 Stephen Cardullo, baseball player
 Pat Curran, mixed martial artist

September

 September 1
 Duke Calhoun, football player
 Sami Callihan, wrestler
 David Carpenter, baseball player
 Jay Armstrong Johnson, actor, singer, and dancer
 September 2 – Spencer Smith, musician
 September 3
 Megan Amram, comedian, writer, producer, and performer
 Domonic Brown, baseball player
 Jamie Cunningham, soccer player
 September 4
 Kris Adams, football player
 Wesley Blake, wrestler
 September 5
 Lakia Aisha Barber, basketball player
 Scott Barnes, baseball player
 Gilbert Brown, basketball player
 September 6
 Mario Addison, football player
 Ramiele Malubay, singer
 September 7
 L. J. Castile, football player
 Lily Cowles, actress
 Evan Rachel Wood, actress, model and musician
 September 8
 Derrick Brown, basketball player
 Ray Fisher, actor
 Wiz Khalifa, rapper
 Justin Peck, choreographer, director, and ballet dancer
 September 9
 Taylor Bagley, actress and model
 Sean Cashman, baseball coach
 Riley Cooper, football player
 Clayton Snyder, actor
 September 10
 Rushern Baker IV, painter and political candidate
 Rhett Bernstein, soccer player
 Paul Goldschmidt, baseball player
 Alex Saxon, actor
 September 11 – Tyler Hoechlin, actor
 September 13
 Juan Archuleta, mixed martial artist
 Marcus Henderson, actor
 Erin Way, actress  
 September 14
 Alade Aminu, basketball player
 Cameron Bradfield, football player
 Michael Crabtree, football player
 Chad Duell, actor
 September 15 – Alex Torres, metalcore guitarist
 September 16
 Colin Cloherty, football player
 Daren Kagasoff, actor
 Anthony Padilla, YouTuber and co-founder of Smosh
 Travis Wall, actor
 September 17 – Lionel Brown, soccer player
 September 19
 Kayla Barron, submarine warfare officer, engineer and NASA astronaut
 Tommie Campbell, football player
 Danielle Panabaker, actress
 September 20
 Jack Lawless, musician
 Sarah Natochenny, actress and voice actress
 September 21
 Jimmy Clausen, football player
 Ryan Guzman, actor
 Pat Nagle, Olympic hockey player
 September 22 – Teyonah Parris, actress 
 September 23 – Skylar Astin, actor, model and singer***
 September 24
 Spencer Treat Clark, actor
 Grey Damon, actor
 Brit Morgan, actress
 Trinidad James, rapper
 September 25
 Massimo Agostinelli, English-born artist, entrepreneur, and activist
 Lars Anderson, baseball player
 David Ausberry, football player
 Greg Bates, country singer/songwriter
 September 27
 Tim Atchison, football player
 Austin Carlile, musician and baseball coach, frontman for Attack Attack! (2006-2008) and Of Mice & Men (2009-2010, 2011-2016)
 September 28
 Josh Alexander, basketball player
 Terence Crawford, boxer
 Hilary Duff, actress and singer
 Scott Fitzpatrick, politician
 September 29
 Dillon Barna, soccer player
 David Del Rio, actor
 Josh Farro, singer and guitarist for Paramore (2004-2010) and frontman for Novel American and Farro
 September 30 – Melinda Sullivan, dancer, choreographer and actress

October

 October 1
 Jennifer Bricker, acrobat and aerialist
 Matthew Daddario, actor
 Stuart Lafferty, actor
 Jason McElwain, autistic athlete and public speaker
 October 2
 Christopher Larkin, Korean-born actor
 Phil Kessel, hockey player
 Ricky Stenhouse Jr., stock car racer
 October 3 – Kaci Battaglia, singer/songwriter, dancer, and actress
 October 5
 Cory Brandon, football player
 Foluke Gunderson, Canadian-born Olympic volleyball player
 October 6
 Jonathan Blake, basketball player
 Samuel, musician
 October 7
 David Arkin, football player
 Alex Cobb, baseball player
 Aiden English, wrestler
 October 8 – Chris Baker, football player
 October 9
 ActionKid, YouTuber and IRL livestreamer
 Craig Brackins, basketball player
 Cory Burns, baseball player
 Aubrey Coleman, basketball player
 Melissa Villaseñor, actress and comedian
 October 10
 Adrian Cárdenas, baseball player
 Carla Esparza, mixed martial artist
 October 11
 Tony Beltran, soccer player
 Mike Conley Jr., basketball player
 October 14
 Eben Britton, baseball player
 Jalil Brown, football player and coach
 Kole Calhoun, baseball player
 Chloe Coscarelli, vegan chef and author
 Jay Pharoah, actor
 October 15
 Marcel Brache, rugby player
 Alan Chin, contemporary artist
 Jesse Levine, American-born Canadian tennis player
 October 17 – Seth Mosley, singer/songwriter and frontman for Me in Motion
 October 18
 Matt Bosher, football player
 Brian Carlwell, basketball player
 Zac Efron, actor
 October 19 – Rick Boogs, wrestler
 October 20 – Jerry Brown, football player (d. 2012)
 October 23 – Carmella, wrestler, dancer, and model
 October 24
 Kwame Adjeman-Pamboe, English-born soccer player
 Sabrina Cervantes, politician
 Chris Holdsworth, mixed martial artist
 Charlie White, Olympic ice dancer
 October 25
 Bill Amis, basketball player
 Keith Berry, mixed martial artist
 October 26
 Hannah Bronfman, DJ, social media influencer, and entrepreneur
 Zena Cardman, geobiologist and NASA astronaut
 Portia Perez, wrestler
 October 27 
 Andrew Bynum, basketball player
 Shawn Porter, boxer
 October 28
 Javier Arenas, football player
 Frank Ocean, rapper
 Tatu Baby, tattoo artist and reality television personality
 October 29 – Ariana Berlin, artistic gymnast, dancer, film actress, and senior producer at Fox Sports
 October 30
 Adrian Battles, football player
 Cesar Chavez, Mexican-born Mariachi singer and politician
 Casey Crawford, basketball player
 October 31 – Clara Chung, singer/songwriter, producer, and composer

November

 November 1
 Anthony Bass, baseball player
 Jack Bolas, middle-distance runner
 Bo Bowling, football player
 Bruce Irvin, football player
 November 2
 Kodi Augustus, basketball player
 Itan Chavira, ice hockey player
 November 3
 Cameron, wrestler, singer, model, and dancer
 Ty Lawson, basketball player
 Colin Kaepernick, football player
 Kyle Seager, baseball player
 Elizabeth Smart, kidnap victim, activist and contributor to ABC News
 November 4
 Jermaine Beal, basketball player
 Shady Blaze, rapper
 Trouble, rapper (d. 2022)
 November 5
 Greer Barnes, soccer player
 Erin Brady, television host, model, and Miss USA 2013
 Kevin Jonas, actor, singer/songwriter, and member of the Jonas Brothers 
  Chris Knierim, figure skater
  O. J. Mayo, basketball player
 Stephanie Edwards, singer
 Allysin Kay, wrestler
 November 6 – Caleb Cotham, baseball player
 November 7
 Hakeem Abdul-Saboor, Olympic bobsledder
 Howard Barbieri, football player
 Rachele Brooke Smith, actress and dancer
 Reba Buhr, voice actress
 November 8 – Sam Bradford, football player
 November 9
 Kyle Clinton, soccer player
 Kevin Coble, basketball player
 November 10
 Mason Aguirre, Olympic snowboarder
 D. J. Augustin, basketball player
 November 11 – Vinny Guadagnino, TV personality
 November 13
 Tim Adleman, baseball player
 November 15 – Tyler Allen, NASCAR race engineer
 November 18
 Jake Abel, actor
 Pierre Allen, football player
 Joe Cada, poker player
 November 19 – Clare Egan, Olympic biathlete
 November 20 – Amelia Rose Blaire, actress
 November 21 – Alex Carnerio, Brazilian-born personal trainer
 November 22
 Erik Barnes, golfer
 Justin Cole, football player
 November 23
 Alex Clayton, tennis player
 Ryan Lane, actor
 Alexia Rodriguez, guitarist and vocalist for Eyes Set to Kill
 Snooki, TV personality
 November 24
 Asiahn, singer/songwriter
 Eric Avila, soccer player
 Elena Satine, Georgian-born actress and singer
 November 25
 Mark Bloom, soccer player
 Trevor Booker, basketball player
 Dolla, rapper (d. 2009)
 November 26
 Kat DeLuna, singer
 Summer Lee, politician
 November 27 – Darnell Carter, football player
 November 30
 Nate Allen, football player
 Chase Anderson, baseball player
 Nick Courtney, soccer player
 Ian Hecox, YouTuber and Co-Founder of Smosh
 Christel Khalil, actress

December

 December 1 – Jill Costello, activist (d. 2010)
 December 2
 Jake Ballard, football player
 Jeremy Beal, football player
 Mary Hill Fulstone (1892–1987), physician
 Teairra Marí, singer
 December 3
 Michael Angarano, actor
 Eric Barone, video game developer, video game designer, artist, composer, and musician
 Dustin Belt, guitarist, music producer, and actor
 Alicia Sacramone, Olympic gymnast
 December 4 
 Orlando Brown, actor and rapper
 Fan 3, rapper, singer, producer, and actress
 Dree Hemingway, model and actress
 December 6
 Chris Banks, soccer player
 Jack DeSena, actor and voice actor
 December 7 
 A. C. H., wrestler
 Aaron Carter, actor and singer (d. 2022)
 Manting Chan, singer/songwriter
 Michael Chiesa, mixed martial artist
 Chris Crocker, internet celebrity, blogger, songwriter, recording artist, and pornographic film actor
 December 8
 Danny Batten, football player
 Pinky Cole, restauranteur
 Aria Curzon, actress
 December 9
 Andre Akpan, soccer player
 Buddy Baumann, baseball player
 Hikaru Nakamura, chess grandmaster
 December 10 – David Carter, football player
 December 11 – Clifton Geathers, football player
 December 13 – Brett Brackett, football player
 December 14
 Nate Collins, football player
 Alex Gaskarth, English-born singer/songwriter, guitarist and frontman for All Time Low
 December 15
 Josh Archibald-Seiffer, pianist and composer
 Scott Copeland, baseball player
 Josh Norman, football player
 December 16
 Nick Additon, baseball player
 Hallee Hirsh, actress
 December 17 – Chelsea Manning, whistleblower
 December 18
 Solomon Bozeman, basketball player and coach
 Rex Brothers, baseball player
 December 19
 Ryan Anderson, basketball player
 Darrion Caldwell, mixed martial artist
 Keith Carlos, football player
 Tyron Carrier, football player
 Ronan Farrow, activist
 December 20
 Lola Blanc, singer/songwriter, director, writer, and actress
 Alana Grace, singer and actress
 December 21
 Brandon Banks, American-born Canadian football player
 Baron Batch, football player and entrepreneur
 December 22 – Zack Britton, baseball player
 December 23 – James Brewer, football player
 December 25
 Alex Bailey, musician, drummer, and bassist
 Charlie Buhler, director, photographer, and producer
 Ned Cameron, producer and singer/songwriter
 Demaryius Thomas, football player (d. 2021)
 December 26
 Karen Alzate, politician
 Sean Bedford, football player
 Jeff Cosgriff, soccer player
 December 28
 Vince Agnew, football player
 Taylor Ball, actor
 Demecus Beach, rugby player
 Thomas Dekker, actor
 Adam Gregory, actor
 December 29
 Katie Blair, actress, model and beauty queen
 Major Culbert, football player
 December 30
 Mykel Benson, football player
 Jason Bohannon, basketball player
 Jake Cuenca, actor and model
 December 31 – Javaris Crittenton, basketball player

Full Date Unknown

 Josh Adams, comic book and commercial artist
 Brooke Annibale, singer/songwriter
 Katherine Arden, novelist
 Brandon Stirling Baker, lighting designer
 Andrew Bayer, DJ and music producer
 Brittany Bell, model, dancer, and beauty pageant titleholder
 Jeremy Blackman, actor and musician
 Kenneth Bogner, politician
 Mia Borders, singer/songwriter
 Kent Brantly, doctor
 Ashley Bratcher, actress
 Melvin LaThomas Brimm, singer/songwriter, vocal producer, dancer-choreographer, and actor
 Leigh Brooklyn, figurative artist
 Michael Brown, pianist and composer
 Shaun Brown, actor
 Rembert Browne, writer
 Tim Bueler, media and political consultant
 Julia Bullock, opera singer
 Aisha Burns, singer/songwriter and violinist
 Emily Calandrelli, science communicator, MIT engineer, and host and executive producer of Xploration Outer Space and Emily's Wonder Lab
 Yvanna Cancela, politician
 Caitlin Cherry, painter, sculptor, and educator
 Lauren Chief Elk, feminist educator and writer
 Tracy Chou, software engineer and advocate for diversity in technology related fields
 Vivian Chu, roboticist and entrepreneur
 Ken Clausen, lacrosse player
 Dave Clauss, recording and mixing engineer
 Kimberly Cole, pop singer/songwriter, music correspondent, and host
 Matt Conn, founder of MidBoss and creator of GaymerX
 Ashley Connor, cinematographer
 Fidel Corrales Jimenez, Cuban-born chess grandmaster
 Alexandra Crandell, model and television personality
 Phillipe Cunningham, politician
 Michelle Curran, Air Force major and pilot
 Shaghayegh Cyrous, Iranian-born artist and curator

Deaths

 January 13 – Taddy Aycock, politician, 45th Lieutenant Governor of Louisiana (born 1915)
 January 15 – Ray Bolger, actor, singer and dancer, Scarecrow in The Wizard of Oz (born 1904)
 January 16 – Joyce Jameson, actress (born 1932)  
 January 22 – R. Budd Dwyer, 30th State Treasurer of the Commonwealth of Pennsylvania (born 1939)
 February – Lou Darvas, artist and cartoonist (born 1913)
 February 5 
 E. Michael Burke, sports executive, naval officer and CIA agent (born 1916)
 William Collier Jr., actor (born 1902)  
 February 22 – Andy Warhol, leading figure in the visual art movement pop art, (born 1928)
 March 3 – Danny Kaye, singer, actor, and comedian (born 1911)
 March 21 – Dean Paul Martin, actor, (born 1951)
 March 22 – Joan Shawlee, actress (born 1926) 
 March 26 – Walter Abel, actor (born 1898)  
 May – John Pierotti, cartoonist (born 1911)
 May 5 – Phil Woolpert, basketball coach (born 1915)
 May 13 – Richard Ellmann, literary critic and biographer (born 1918)
 June 25 – Boudleaux Bryant, American songwriter (born 1920)
 August 19 – Hayden Rorke, actor (born 1910)  
 August 24 – Bayard Rustin, African American civil rights activist (born 1912)
 August 27 – Scott La Rock, American disc jockey (born 1962)
 October 12 – Alf Landon, 1936 Republican presidential nominee (born 1887)
 October 18 – Pete Carpenter, musician and arranger (born 1914)
 November 2 – Claude J. Jasper, Wisconsin politician (born 1905/1906)
 November 22 – W. Haydon Burns, 35th Governor of Florida (born 1912)
 December 1 – James Baldwin, author and civil rights activist (born 1924)
 December 4 – Arnold Lobel, children's book author (born 1933)
 December 4 – Rouben Mamoulian, film and theatre director (born 1897 in Russia)
 December 5 – Molly O'Day, country singer (born 1923)
 December 17 – Linda Wong, American pornographic actress (born 1951)
 December 21
 Ralph Nelson, film and television director, producer, writer, and actor (born 1916)
 Robert Paige, actor (born 1911)

See also 
 1987 in American television
 List of American films of 1987
 Timeline of United States history (1970–1989)

References

External links
 

 
1980s in the United States
United States
United States
Years of the 20th century in the United States